Percy Eric Johnston (24 February 1914 – 16 March 2005) was an Australian water polo player. He competed in the men's tournament at the 1948 Summer Olympics.

References

1914 births
2005 deaths
Australian male water polo players
Olympic water polo players of Australia
Water polo players at the 1948 Summer Olympics